The Council of Ministers (1969–70) of Legislative Assembly, Kerala state (better known as C. Achutha Menon ministry - first term) was the Council of Ministers, the executive wing of state government, in the Indian state of Kerala. The ministry was led (Chief Minister) by Communist Party of India leader C. Achutha Menon from 1 November 1969 to 3 August 1970 and had eight ministries.

Ministers

Resignations
N K Seshan resigned w.e.f. 2 April 1970 and O. Koran resigned w.e.f. 1 August 1970

References

 https://web.archive.org/web/20160708185932/http://www.prd.kerala.gov.in/ministers49_main.htm

Menon 01
Communist Party of India state ministries
1969 establishments in Kerala
1970 disestablishments in India
Cabinets established in 1969
Cabinets disestablished in 1950